Hypotacha raffaldii is a species of moth in the family Erebidae described by Emilio Berio in 1939. It is found in Eritrea, Oman, Saudi Arabia, Sudan and Yemen.

References

Moths described in 1939
Hypotacha
Moths of Africa
Moths of Asia